Betty Ren Wright (June 15, 1927 – December 31, 2013) was an American writer of children's fiction including Christina's Ghost, The Dollhouse Murders, The Ghosts Of Mercy Manor and A Ghost in The House.

Background 

Wright lived in Kenosha, Wisconsin, with her husband, George A. Frederiksen, a painter. She also wrote several short stories such as Sweet remembrance and thirty-five picture books.

Works 
Novels
 Getting Rid of Marjorie (1981)
 The Secret Window (1982)
 The Dollhouse Murders (1983)
 Ghosts Beneath Our Feet (1984)
 Christina's Ghost (1985); also published as The Ghosts in the Attic
 The Summer of Mrs. MacGregor (1986)
 A Ghost in the Window (1987); sequel to The Secret Window
 The Pike River Phantom (1988)
 Rosie and the Dance of the Dinosaurs (1989)
 The Ghost of Ernie P (1990)
 The Midnight Mystery (1991)
 The Scariest Night (1991)
 A Ghost in the House (1991)
 The Ghost of Popcorn Hill (1993)
 The Ghosts of Mercy Manor (1993)
 The Ghost Witch (1993)
 The Ghost Comes Calling (1994)
 Out of the Dark (1995)
 Nothing But Trouble (1995)
 Haunted Summer (1996)
 Getting Rid of Katherine (1996)
 Too Many Secrets (1997)
 The Ghost in Room 11 (1997)
 A Ghost in the Family (1998)
 The Phantom of Five Chimneys (1998)
 The Moonlight Man (2000)
 The Wish Master (2000)
 Crandall's Castle (2003)
 Princess for a Week (2006)
Selected picture book stories
 The Yellow Cat (1952)
 Jim Jump (1954)
 Roundabout Train (1958)
 I Want to Read (1965)
 The Cat Who Stamped His Feet (1975)
 Rodger's Upside Down Day (1979)
 I Like Being Alone (1981)
 The Time Machine (1981)
 Pet Detectives (1999)
 The Blizzard (2003)
 Rackety-Boom (1953)
 Johnny Go RoundShort Stories

The Invisible Cat (1958) Alfred Hitchcock's Magazine

 References 

 External links 
 Obituary in School Library Journal''
 Interview by publisher Holiday House
 
  (including 9 "from old catalog")

1927 births
2013 deaths
Ghost story writers
American children's writers
American book editors
American mystery novelists
20th-century American women writers
American women children's writers
Women mystery writers
American women novelists
20th-century American novelists
21st-century American women